Stonychophora is a genus of camel crickets in the tribe Rhaphidophorini. Species in this genus can be found from Indo-China and Malesia to New Caledonia.

Species
The Orthoptera Species File lists:

Stonychophora alpha (Karny, 1930)
Stonychophora angulata Gorochov, 2002
Stonychophora biaki Gorochov, 2010
Stonychophora buruensis (Karny, 1925)
Stonychophora cattien Gorochov, 2012
Stonychophora crenulata (Brunner von Wattenwyl, 1893)
Stonychophora cultrifer (Zacher, 1909)
Stonychophora denticulata Gorochov, 2010
Stonychophora elegans Karny, 1934
Stonychophora falsa Gorochov, 2002
Stonychophora foeda (Brunner von Wattenwyl, 1888)
Stonychophora fulva (Brunner von Wattenwyl, 1888) type species (as Rhaphidophora fulva = S. fulva fulva, locality Java)
Stonychophora furca Gorochov, 2002
Stonychophora glabra Chopard, 1940
Stonychophora griffinii (Karny, 1928)
Stonychophora halmahera Gorochov, 2012
Stonychophora jayapurae Gorochov, 2010
Stonychophora khmerica Gorochov, 2010
Stonychophora kuthyi (Griffini, 1911)
Stonychophora maculata Gorochov, 2010
Stonychophora manokwari Gorochov, 2010
Stonychophora minahassa Gorochov, 2012
Stonychophora minor Ander, 1938
Stonychophora nigerrima (Brunner von Wattenwyl, 1888)
Stonychophora palauensis Vickery & Kevan, 1999
Stonychophora papua (Brancsik, 1898)
Stonychophora parafulva Gorochov, 2010
Stonychophora parafurca Gorochov, 2010
Stonychophora pileata Gorochov, 2012
Stonychophora salomonensis Willemse, 1942
Stonychophora sulawesi Gorochov, 2012
Stonychophora supiori Gorochov, 2010
Stonychophora sylvestris Gorochov, 2010
Stonychophora tatianae Gorochov, 1999
Stonychophora tessellata (Karny, 1930)
Stonychophora tioman Gorochov, 2012
Stonychophora trilobata Gorochov, 2012
Stonychophora trusmadi Gorochov, 2010

References

Rhaphidophoridae
Ensifera genera
Orthoptera of Asia
Orthoptera of Indo-China